The Golden Reel Award for Outstanding Achievement in Sound Editing – Music Score and Musical for Episodic Long Form Broadcast Media is an annual award given by the Motion Picture Sound Editors. It honors sound editors whose work has warranted merit in the field of television; in this case, their work in the field of music editing in television. The awards title has gone through many incarnations since its inception, but its focus has been on honoring exemplary work of music editors. The term "long form" was added to the category in 2002, as long form television had been awarded under both the category titled Best Sound Editing – Television Movies of the Week – Music, and Best Sound Editing – Television Episodic – Music, or some moniker of them, since 1997 (with the exceptions of 2011 and 2015). The award has been given with its current title since 2018.

Winners and nominees

1990s

2000s

2010s

2020s

References 

Awards established in 1997
Golden Reel Awards (Motion Picture Sound Editors)